The 2017–18 season of Flamengo Basketball is the 98th season of the club, and the club's 10th in the Novo Basquete Brasil (NBB). They played the season coming from their tied worst result in league history (5th place), after four consecutive titles on the previous years. The club captain Marcelinho Machado retired at the end of the season.

Offseason

Pre-season

The season

Roster

Depth chart

Transactions

In

|}

Out

|}

Player statistics

NBB regular season

Players in italic left the team during the season.
Updated: 9 March, 2018

Competitions

2017 Liga Sudamericana

2017-18 NBB

League table

Results summary

Results by round

Matches

Results overview

NBB Playoffs

Quarterfinals

Semifinals

References

External links
Official club website 
Flamengo Team Profile at New Basket Brazil 
Flamengo Team Profile at Latinbasket.com 

Flamengo Basketball seasons
Flamengo Basketball
Novo Basquete Brasil seasons